Mirzamohammadi-ye Pain (also Romanized as Mīrzāmoḩammadī-ye Pā’īn; also known as Mīrzāmoḩammadī-ye Soflá) is a village in Sornabad Rural District, Hamaijan District, Sepidan County, Fars Province, Iran. At the 2006 census, its population was 19, in 6 families.

References 

Populated places in Sepidan County